Jugowiec  is a village in the administrative district of Gmina Środa Śląska, within Środa Śląska County, Lower Silesian Voivodeship, in south-western Poland. Prior to 1945 it was in Germany, the German name was "Hausdorf".

References

Jugowiec